Kaddish for an Unborn Child is a novel by Imre Kertész, first published in 1990.

The novel deals with the struggles of a Holocaust survivor after the war, explaining to a friend why he cannot bring a child into a world that could allow such atrocities to happen. The book also deals with the narrator's failed marriage, his unsuccessful literary career, and the concept of his Jewishness.

Kertész won the Nobel Prize for Literature in 2002 "for writing that upholds the fragile experience of the individual against the barbaric arbitrariness of history".

English translations

Kaddish for an Unborn Child, tr. Tim Wilkinson, 2004, 
Kaddish for a Child Not Born, tr.  Christopher C. Wilson and Katharina M. Wilson, 1999, 

1990 novels
Hungarian novels
Novels about the aftermath of the Holocaust